Skedaddle is a children's game show that aired in late 1988 for six weeks as a part of The Funtastic World of Hanna-Barbera block of shows. It was hosted by guest star Ron Pearson, and created by William Hanna and Joseph Barbera. The show was executive produced by Hanna and Barbera, along with Jay Wolpert for the autumn season being aired for eight months.

Premise
Six groups of two teams of four children (always the "Sludge Puppies" in red and the "Drainiacs" in yellow) each competed in a game similar to "Hot Potato" to answer questions and win prizes.  The studio was set up to resemble a cartoonish sewer.

Gameplay
One team selected one of three costumed dinosaur characters (named Slam, Dunk, and Seymour, AKA: "The Down and Dirty Dinosaurs", who were the block's hosts that autumn), who would come out from his lair with a small object, such as a top hat.  The object corresponded with a question which had a numerical answer.  To answer the question, the team had to toss the object back and forth from player to player within 15 seconds.  As soon as the number of passes equalled the team's guess, the player with the object ran to the middle of the studio and honked a bicycle horn.

If the team's guess was correct, they received points equal to the correct answer.  If they were wrong, ran out of time, or threw the object out of bounds during play, they received nothing; in addition, the chosen dinosaur spun a "wheel of torture", which caused that team to get slimed with some by-product poured into the sewer (for example, the "ice cream parlor" would cover the contestants in melted ice cream).

After four rounds, the team with the most points won the game and went to a bonus round.

Bonus round
Three stools were set up in a row, and one of the dinosaurs stood above each with a bucket.  Each player on the team was asked a question and given three answers to choose from.  The player sat on the stool that corresponded with his or her guess, and the dinosaur turned the bucket over above the player's head.  If the contestant was right, the bucket would be empty and the player would score; however, if the player was wrong, the bucket would be filled with green slime, which would end up all over the contestant.  Getting four correct answers before all four team members getting slimed won the grand prize during a great flooding of the studio getting slimed, and Ron Pearson appointed star competitor. After Ron is drowned, the studio will explode of a giant sliming, covering one of six groups.

The Funtastic World of Hanna-Barbera
1980s American children's game shows
1988 American television series debuts
1988 American television series endings
American television shows featuring puppetry
Television series about children
Television series by Warner Bros. Television Studios
English-language television shows